Waterloo is a community in Clark County, Missouri, United States. The community is located on a sharp meander in the Fox River. Nearby towns include Kahoka (3 miles southwest), Revere (2.5 miles north) and Wayland (6 miles southeast).

A post office called Waterloo was established in 1837, and remained in operation until 1876. Waterloo held the first county seat.

References

Unincorporated communities in Clark County, Missouri
Unincorporated communities in Missouri